Volkan Demirel (born 27 October 1981) is a Turkish coach, pundit and former professional footballer. He is the manager of the Turkish club Hatayspor. For many years, he was the starting goalkeeper of Fenerbahçe and the Turkish national team.

Club career
Demirel was born in Fatih, İstanbul to a family from Artvin with Georgian and Laz roots. He joined Kartalspor as an 18-year-old in 1999 and became the starting goalkeeper the following year. Demirel played in 51 matches over the next two seasons, earning a transfer to Fenerbahçe at the start of the 2002 season.

Originally backing up Rüştü Reçber and Recep Biler, Demirel made his debut for the club on 26 April 2003. After Reçber's transfer to Barcelona, Demirel competed in 19 league matches, splitting time with Biler (who played in 14 matches). He also featured in three Turkish Cup matches and won the 2003–04 Süper Lig title with Fenerbahçe.

Following season, Demirel won another Süper Lig title, but was relegated to the bench after Rüştü Reçber returned to the club at the start of the season. Demirel was the starting goalkeeper at the start of the 2005–06 season, but was benched halfway through the season. At the start of the 2006–07, Demirel was the first choice keeper, but was supplanted by Reçber for a second time. After Reçber suffered an injury, Serdar Kulbilge took over as starting goalkeeper in favor of Demirel for the rest of the season. Demirel played in 25 league matches the following season, with Kulbilge playing the rest. Demirel was the starting goalkeeper for the Fenerbahçe squad that progressed past the group stages of the 2007–08 UEFA Champions League. In the Round of 16 tie with Sevilla, Demirel made several mistakes, costing two goals. However, he went on to save three penalties in the penalty shootout, helping the club progress to the quarter-finals, the first time in club history. Fenerbahçe went on to face Chelsea, losing 2–3 on aggregate. Following Kulbilge's transfer to Kocaelispor, Demirel took over as starting goalkeeper. Demirel signed a four-year contract extension at the end of the 2008–09 season.

International career

Demirel was called up to the Turkey U-20 squad in 2001, being capped four times. He was capped by the Turkey U21 national team 21 times between 2001 and 2003, and earned his first call up to the Turkey national team in 2004. He made his debut for the national team on 28 April 2004 in a friendly against Belgium. Demirel came on as a substitute in the second half.

Demirel was the starting goalkeeper for the Turkey national team at the UEFA Euro 2008 championships, reaching the semi-finals for the first time in team history. He started all three group stages matches, but was suspended for two matches after receiving a red card against the Czech Republic for viciously pushing Jan Koller to the ground after Jan for unknown reasons ran and shouted at him.

In 2014, just before the UEFA Euro 2016 qualifying match against Kazakhstan, Volkan Demirel left the Turkish National Football Team after a dispute with a fan. After Demirel's refusal to play with the national team, Volkan Babacan took over as the starter for the UEFA Euro 2016 Qualifiers.

Managerial career 
On 2 September 2019, Fenerbahçe announced that Demirel was retired and would continue his career as an assistant coach in the team. He worked under Ersun Yanal, Tahir Karapınar, Erol Bulut and Emre Belözoğlu respectively.

On 14 July 2021, it was announced that he ended his assistant coaching career at Fenerbahçe in a press conference he held with Fenerbahçe president Ali Koç.

Fatih Karagümrük
On 17 December 2021, Demirel signed a two-and-a-half-year deal with Fatih Karagümrük

His first match as manager was a 1–0 away win over Göztepe on 19 December.

Hatayspor
On 21 September 2022, Demirel signed with Hatayspor for one season with an option to extend.

Personal life
Volkan Demirel is married to former Miss Belgium Zeynep Sever. They have two daughters named Yade (born in February 2014) and Yeda (born in September 2017).

Career statistics

Club

International

Managerial

Honours
Fenerbahçe
Süper Lig: 2003–04, 2004–05, 2006–07, 2010–11, 2013–14
Turkish Cup: 2011–12, 2012–13
Turkish Super Cup: 2007, 2009, 2014

Turkey
UEFA European Championship bronze medalist: 2008

References

External links

 
 
 Profile at Fenerbahce.org 

1981 births
Living people
Footballers from Istanbul
Turkish footballers
Turkey international footballers
Turkey youth international footballers
Turkey under-21 international footballers
UEFA Euro 2008 players
Kartalspor footballers
Fenerbahçe S.K. footballers
Association football goalkeepers
Süper Lig players
TFF First League players
Fenerbahçe S.K. (football) non-playing staff
Turkish football managers
Fatih Karagümrük S.K. managers
Hatayspor managers
Süper Lig managers